Lecithocera dissonella is a moth in the family Lecithoceridae. It was described by Francis Walker in 1864. It is found on Borneo.

Adults are pale cinereous-straw colour, the forewings ferruginous speckled, with two black points in the disc, one before the middle, the other beyond the middle, continued to the interior border by means of a brown streak. There is a row of black points along the apical part of the costa and along the exterior border. The hindwings are dark cinereous.

References

Moths described in 1864
dissonella